AKM Maidul Islam (1 May 1943 – 11 May 2018) was a Jatiya Party politician who served as the Jatiya Sangsad member representing the Kurigram-3 constituency.

Early life
Islam had a M.A. degree.

Career
Islam was elected to parliament from Kurigram-3 in 1986, 2008, and 2014 as a candidate of Jatiya Party (Ershad). He served in the cabinet of President Ziaur Rahman in 1979 and the cabinet of Hussain Mohammad Ershad in 1985. He was the Minister of Post, Telecommunication Ministry, Minister of Mineral Resources, and Minister of Civil Aviation and Tourism Ministry.

Death
Islam died on 11 May 2018 in United Hospitals Limited, Dhaka, Bangladesh.

References

1943 births
2018 deaths
Bangladesh Jatiya Party politicians
3rd Jatiya Sangsad members
4th Jatiya Sangsad members
9th Jatiya Sangsad members
10th Jatiya Sangsad members
Place of birth missing